The Resistance Tour was a worldwide concert tour by English alternative rock band Muse in support of their fifth studio album The Resistance. The opening European leg began on 22 October 2009 and ended on 4 December 2009, comprising 30 shows. The second leg, which began on 7 January 2010, included thirteen shows, seven of which were part of the Australasian Big Day Out shows. A North American leg of 26 shows took place in early 2010. Nine stadium shows took place in Europe in 2010, with three of those dates taking place at Wembley Stadium and Old Trafford Cricket Ground. A second round of North American concerts took place throughout September and October 2010. These dates focused on secondary markets and other areas not previously hit on the tour. A return to Australasia took place throughout December 2010 and Muse are confirmed as openers for U2's 360° Tour dates in South America in spring 2011 and also played further European shows in the summer of 2011. At the conclusion of 2010, the tour was placed on Pollstar's annual "Year End Top 50 Worldwide Concert Tours", and appeared 13th worldwide, earning over $76 million with 64 shows in 2010.

Background
A promotional tour was first confirmed by Muse in March 2009 when they announced that "We are pleased to confirm that Muse will be touring in the UK, Europe and North America this autumn." In June 2009, the band confirmed the dates for an opening European leg of "The Resistance Tour", which they announced would comprise 30 shows. Tickets for the shows in the United Kingdom, Sweden and France went on sale from 5 June, while tickets for other European dates went on fan pre-sale between 11 June (Netherlands) and 17 June (Spain). Tickets for the UK arena dates, both pre-sale and general sale, sold out within minutes of going on sale. On 22 September 2009, it was announced that extra tickets for many of the European concerts would be sold beginning on 24 September.

Warm-up shows

On 18 August 2009, a duo of concerts collectively entitled "A Seaside Rendezvous" was confirmed for 4 and 5 September. The concerts were the first in the band's childhood hometown of Teignmouth, Devon in over ten years, as well as the first shows since the band's appearance at V Festival in August 2008 and since the completion of The Resistance. The performances included the debut appearances of five songs from the upcoming album, including lead single "Uprising", "Undisclosed Desires" and title track "Resistance".

The band also performed a small number of shows at other venues in Europe, before they supported Irish rock band U2 for nine dates on the North American leg of their 360° Tour in September and October and in South America in March and April 2011.

Design and setup

In revealing news of the tour, music magazine NME quoted the band as saying "We are coming up with a different and exciting stage set and production which will encompass our fans", suggesting that the stage will be placed in the middle of each arena, with the audience surrounding the band, a technique first used by prog-rock band Yes in 1978. On 22 July, via their Twitter page, the band revealed that they were "working on set design", hinting at fans to "Expect an 8" stone 'enge"." In September 2009, the BBC quoted drummer Dominic Howard as revealing that the band members will "be on these three pillars moving up and down", adding that "There might be a loose narrative that we're trapped in some kind of institution and we're trying to break out of it", which he promises will "look impressive." Music website Drowned in Sound also spoke to Howard, publishing the following quotes regarding stage setup:

For the stadium performances, the band changed the set design completely. Like the arena tour, the design was based on the book 1984 by George Orwell but this time the new design featured the band on a triangular-pyramid shaped stage. The stage was designed and built by the Belgian company Stageco (who also designed the stage for U2's 360° Tour). It features a ball on the top which is said to be the "All Seeing Eye" from the book 1984. On the pyramid itself there are separated blocks, with most of them being screens which project animations and also turn inside out occasionally. There is a catwalk-like structure leading from the front of the stage into the crowd, with an elephant lift at the end which moves 10m in the air and 15m forward, with space for 3 people. This so-called elephant lift would rise into the air and over the audience during performances of Undisclosed Desires and Take a Bow (the latter of which involved frontman Matthew Bellamy wearing an LED suit). During performances of "Exogenesis Symphony: Part I – Overture" a U.F.O is released into the crowd with an acrobat hanging from the rear of it reaching for the people. However this has not been used in all stadium performances.

The band's festival performances have been different from both these stage performances. For the shows in Australasia in early 2010 and the headline appearance at Coachella the band used 3 video strips in a similar arrangement to the top halves of the pillars but on the back wall of the stage. The festival stage was redesigned for the 2010 European festival shows with 3 groups of hexagonal video screens on the back wall of the stage and different visuals to those used earlier in the year for some songs, although for one show in Latvia and two shows in Asia Muse used only one solo screen. Also on one occasion, the UFO was used, in Germany. For the band's headlining set at Glastonbury Festival 2010, U2 guitarist The Edge was invited on stage to play "Where The Streets Have No Name" with Muse, seeing as U2 had cancelled their planned slot for the previous day due to Bono's back injury from rehearsals weeks earlier.

Tour dates

Setlists
Throughout the vast majority of the tour, every arena concert would commence with a performance of "Uprising", with the main set ending with either "Unnatural Selection" or "Plug in Baby" and an encore consisting of Exogenesis: Symphony Part 1 (Overture), Stockholm Syndrome and Knights of Cydonia concluding the set. However, towards the end of the tour, Exogenesis Part 1 would sometimes be used as an opener. Also at these shows, Knights of Cydonia would be performed early in the set, signalling the first time this song would not be used as a concert opener or closer since 2006. Uprising would also be played to similar effect at these shows, with that also only being performed as the opening song in concerts prior to the ones opening with Exogenesis Part 1.

Concerts taking place within arenas would include roughly between 16–18 songs on average, while stadium shows were roughly 21 songs long.

Box office score data

Cancelled dates

 Performance in Broomfield cancelled due to heavy snow on the Vail pass blocking the way to the venue. Muse immediately announced a new date for the Denver area to take place at the Pepsi Center on 2 October 2010.
 Performance in Stockholm, Sweden cancelled due to unforeseen circumstances.
 Performances in Kansas City and St. Louis were cancelled due to the pending birth of bassist Chris Wolstenholme's fifth child. This also affected the band's performances in Cincinnati and Columbus, which were rescheduled to 11 October 2010 and 12 October 2010, respectively.

Personnel
Matthew Bellamy – lead vocals, guitar, piano, keytar on "Undisclosed Desires"
Christopher Wolstenholme – bass, backing vocals, harmonica
Dominic Howard – drums
Morgan Nicholls – keyboards, synthesizers, backing vocals, percussion, brief guitar on "United States of Eurasia".

References

Muse (band) concert tours
2009 concert tours
2010 concert tours
2011 concert tours